Vassar is a community located in southeastern Manitoba.

History 
Vassar's first inhabitants settled in 1896 with the railroad's arrival. It is commonly believed that Vassar got its name after the first-born son of one of the first inhabitants, the Carpenter family.

The first store, post office, and school were all built in the early 1900s. A hotel was built in the late 1920s and parts of that building are incorporated into a current motel.

Notable people 
 Marjorie Beaucage (born 1947), Métis filmmaker

References 
 

 Geographical Names of Manitoba - Vassar (pg. 281) :published by Conservation Manitoba 2008

Unincorporated communities in Eastman Region, Manitoba